Mediator of RNA polymerase II transcription subunit 30 is an enzyme that in humans is encoded by the MED30 gene. It represents subunit Med30 of the Mediator complex and is metazoan-specific, having no homologues in yeasts.

Interactions 

MED30 has been shown to interact with MED22.

References

Further reading 

 
 
 
 
 
 
 
 
 
 
 

Protein domains